James Bailey (6 April 1908 – 10 February 1988) was an English cricketer. Bailey was a left-handed batsman who bowled slow left-arm orthodox spin. Bailey played as an all-rounder.

Bailey made his first-class debut for Hampshire in 1927 against Middlesex in the County Championship. Bailey played regularly for Hampshire from 1927 to 1934. After four poor seasons with the bat, Bailey found form in the 1931 season when he scored 922 runs at an average of 19.61. This season included his first century and half century. In the 1932 season Bailey took over fifty wickets for the first time, claiming 76 runs at a bowling average of 21.90, which included six five-wicket hauls, one of which yielded him career best figures of 7/7 against Nottinghamshire. In 1932 and 1933, Bailey once again made over 500 runs.

Bailey left the club in 1934 to join the staff at Lord's, in order to qualify for Middlesex. In 1934 Bailey made his debut for the Marylebone Cricket Club against Yorkshire. From 1934 to 1935 Bailey represented the Marylebone Cricket Club in five first-class matches, making his final first-class appearance for the club against Cambridge University.

In 1936 and 1932 Bailey played for Accrington Cricket Club in the Lancashire League.

Four years after last representing Hampshire in first-class cricket, Bailey returned in 1938 to play for the county once more, playing his return match against Warwickshire. In the 1939 County Championship Bailey had his most successful season with the bat, scoring 1,329 runs at an average of 32.41, with one century and eight half centuries. With the onset of the Second World War first-class cricket was suspended after the 1939 season.

After the war Bailey continued to represent Hampshire until the 1949 County Championship. In 1946 Bailey scored 1,410 runs, but due to a leg injury his ability to bowl was limited and his return when he did was expensive. In the 1947 season Bailey scored 977 runs and took 53 wickets.

The 1948 season was highly successful for Bailey, where he scored 1,399 runs at an average of 31.79 with nine half centuries. With the ball it was Bailey's standout season with 121 wickets at a bowling average of 18.13, with best figures of 7-39, one of nine five wicket hauls. Bailey also took ten wickets in a match three times. Bailey thus achieved the double by scoring over 1,000 runs and taking over 100 wickets.

Bailey again had success in the 1949 season where he claimed 86 wickets at a bowling average of 30.95, with four five wicket hauls and once taking ten wickets in a match. Bailey also scored 1,254 runs at an average of 26.68, with seven fifties. After the 1949 season Bailey retired from first-class cricket.

In 1952 Bailey came out of retirement to play for Hampshire in a single first-class match against Warwickshire, where he claimed his final three first-class wickets. In his 242 first-class match for Hampshire he scored	9,302 at an average of 24.93, with five centuries, 51 half centuries and a top score of 133. With the ball Bailey took 467 wickets at a bowling average of 26.97, with 25 five wicket hauls and ten wickets or more in a match five times. Bailey's best figures were 7-7. Bailey claimed 62 catches for the county.

In addition to representing Hampshire and the Marylebone Cricket Club, Bailey also represented the Players in a single first-class match in the 1932 Gentlemen v Players fixture.

Bailey died at Southampton, Hampshire on 10 February 1988.

External links
Jim Bailey at Cricinfo
Jim Bailey at CricketArchive
Matches and detailed statistics for Jim Bailey

1908 births
1988 deaths
People from the City of Winchester
English cricketers
Hampshire cricketers
Players cricketers
Marylebone Cricket Club cricketers
English cricketers of 1919 to 1945